Tinagma leucanthes is a moth in the  family Douglasiidae. It is found in Australia, where it has been recorded from New South Wales and southern Queensland.

References

Moths described in 1897
Douglasiidae